Bridgewater School is a British Independent school, located in Worsley in Greater Manchester.

History
The school was established in 1950 as a boys school, its name coming from Francis Egerton, 3rd Duke of Bridgewater who commissioned the building of the nearby Bridgewater Canal in 1760. The school moved to its current semi-rural setting soon after, in the 1960s it became fully co-educational. A sixth form building was also constructed as the school expanded, its black and white design in keeping with the aesthetic of the older main building, Drywood Hall.

Present day
In the 1990s the school added new modern buildings and later, in the mid-2000s, added modern sporting facilities such as an all-weather pitch and state of the art indoor sports hall. This new building, which houses a modern Drama studio as well, was opened in 2006 by the Northern Ireland international footballer, David Healy.

The school is independently run and as such, charges tuition fees.

Head
The current headteacher is J A T Nairn.

Notable alumni
A variety of notable alumni have their origins from Bridgewater School.

Neil Menzies attended the school having left in the mid-1970s, and has since progressed to be an eminent surveyor in the field of Quantity Surveying. He is a long-term member of the Royal Institution of Chartered Surveyors (RICS), and is widely considered by many to have helped define the approach of the modern surveyor with a charismatic and unique approach to his craft; particularly in relation to dispute resolution in construction contract disputes.

References

External links
 http://www.bridgewater-school.co.uk
 Independent Schools Inspectorate, 2007
 Independent Schools Inspectorate, 2022

Private schools in Salford
Educational institutions established in 1950
1950 establishments in England